Hylaecullulus fordi is a species of Ediacaran petalonamid from the Charnwood Forest of Leicestershire, England that serves as an important rangeomorph because of its multifoliate anatomy, known from its fossils. Its overall body plan is similar to that of a goblet, from which its name, Hylaecullulus, derives.

Etymology
The name of the type species, "fordi", was given to honour Trevor Ford, who made important contributions to the Ediacaran fauna.

Discovery

Hylaecullulus fordi was discovered in the hilly tract of Charnwood Forest in 2018 by a team led by C. G. Kenchington. This team found six well-preserved fossils, all of which had fossilised with the lateral view of the animal visible, from the top of the Bradgate Formation of the Maple Group. Although two specimens out of the six fossils found were poorly preserved, they were still assigned to the genus, with all of the specimens being preserved as epirelief (positive relief) impressions. After the discovery of these fossils, master molds were made of them, which are currently being housed within the British Geological Survey, with the holotypes being kept in situ.

Description
Hylaecullulus fordi represents a multifoliate rangeomorph consisting of a holdfast along with a similarly sized crown, all of which are connected by a straight, proportionally long and narrow stem. The holdfast mainly consists of multiple concentric rings making up a triangular shape at its junction with the stem. The stem is shown as being mainly straight in the fossil specimens, along with being quite uniform in width while also being larger than the crown that sits atop the stem. The crown is multifoliate and has a sub-circular outline comprising multiple folia that all emanate from a single point from the distal-point end of the stem, with the aforementioned folia being either unfurled or furled with signs of them being unconstrained and alongside that, also showing distal inflation.

The main branches of the folia show furled, radiating and unconstrained proximal inflation- with unfurled branches being locally present in some specimens. Alongside the main branches, there are also tertiary branches that exhibit furled, constrained and radiation as well as distal inflation. The folia, along with the first- and second-order branches of the crown, may manifest "eccentric branches" which appear at any point in their height these branches all conform to the branching pattern of their host branch, unlike other rangeomorphs, but do not conform to the branching pattern of their neighboring folia.

Measurements
The heights of the known specimens (which are measured from the base of the stem) range from about 7.6cm-37.6cm (2.99213-14.80315 inches). The diameter of the disc ranges from 2.7cm-27cm (1.06299-10.6299 inches) although it increases in proportion with the total height.

Importance

Comparison to other rangeomorphs

Hylaecullulus fordi fossils are distinguished from other rangeomorphs because of its multifoliate nature, that appears only in Bradgatia and Primocandelabrum -both of which posses the multifoliate nature of Hylaecullulus. These 2 taxa also co-occur alongside fossils of H. fordi on the Bed B of the Bradgate Formation. Although they both deviate a little from Hylaecullulus. Bradgatia has a similar multifoliate anatomy, although it lacks a proper stem and instead has a small, bulb-shaped holdfast. The architecture of the branches within Bradgatia are also distinct from Hylaecullulus since the folia seen in Bradgatia are unfurled and show signs of radiation from all resolvable orders of its branching. on the other hand, Primocandelabrum only superficially resembles Hylaecullulus this being because it possesses a more anatomically simple holdfast alongside a straight–albeit, proportionally shorter– stem. The bushy crown of Primocandelabrum distinguishes itself from the crown of H. fordi because of its notably triangular outline that is preserved along with branches that are coarser and are in the shape of a Candelabrum. The poor preservation of the type specimens of H. fordi separate its possible affinity as being a close relative of 'Primocandelabrum because the specimens collected from Newfoundland render the preservation of their finer branching architecture impossible to determine, although the specimens from Charnwood Forest consistently distinguishes it from Primocandelabrum.

Importance to Ediacaran fauna and rangeomorphsHylaecullulus'' presents itself as a representative of a greater architectural complexity alongside truly modern organization of body plans, which hereby also results in highlighting the importance of modularity when evolving to have a large, more complex body-plan in phylogenetically disparate taxa and clades. The evolution of eccentric growth in the form of having eccentric branches shows that they can illustrate their ability to respond to physical, external stimuli which also result in them conforming to considerable environmental tolerance.

See also
 List of Ediacaran genera

References

Petalonamae
Ediacaran
Ediacaran life
Aquatic animals
Ediacaran Europe
Enigmatic prehistoric animal genera
Fossil taxa described in 2018